Testify is the debut album by American Idol season thirteen winner, Caleb Johnson. Its first single was released in July 2014 and the album was released on August 12, 2014, by Interscope Records and is produced by Howard Benson.

Background
The album was first announced soon after Johnson won American Idol. Then it was assumed that the album would be self-titled but on June 23, it was revealed that the album would be titled, Testify. Johnson co-wrote six of the ten tracks and worked with musicians such as, Blair Daly, James Michael of Sixx:AM,  Sam Hollander, Aloe Blacc, Justin Tranter of Semi Precious Weapons, and Dave Bassett. The album's first single will be released in July 2014 and his Idol coronation song, "As Long as You Love Me" will serve as a bonus track.

Johnson recorded the album in three weeks in between the Idol finale and tour. He says, "The week after the show ended, I flew all over the place and did a press run," "Immediately after that, I flew back to L.A. and started working on the record. I wrote 12 or 13 songs. Out of those, we picked eight to put on the record." About the songwriting progress, "We really just bounced off each other and pulled these songs out. Most of these songs we wrote in half a day, because we were going so quickly", says Johnson.

Critical reception

The Knoxville News Sentinel's Chuck Campbell says that Johnson "has a likeable personality and a strong voice. But he's an underdeveloped performer on his undercooked new Testify, blandly molded to appeal to an overbroad audience, much like American Idol itself."

Commercial performance
The album debuted on Billboard 200 at No. 24 with 11,000 copies sold in its debut week, giving him the distinction of having the lowest first week sales and  inaugural chart position of any American Idol winner.  The album has sold 24,000 copies in the United States as of April 2016. Including album equivalent units, a total of 30,695 units has been sold as of March 2018.

Johnson also has the distinction of being the first American Idol winner to have their Idol coronation song, "As Long as You Love Me," fail to chart on the Billboard Hot 100 charts.

Track listing

Personnel
Adapted from AllMusic.

Performers
All vocals – Caleb Johnson
Background vocals – Justin Hawkins, Johnny Litten, Lenny Skolnik
Choir/chorus – Monet Bagneris, Auvrell Christophe, Calvin Dupree, Tommy Leonard

Design
Photography – Brian Bowen-Smith 
Art direction – Stephanie Hsu, Sean Mosher-Smith
Design – Sean Mosher-Smith

Musicians

Baritone saxophone – Cochemea Gastelum
Bass – Jon Button, Chris Chaney
Drums – Randy Cooke, Josh Freese, Joe Rickard
Guitars – Josh Freese, Phil X
Hammond B3 – Howard Benson
Horns – The Dap Kings Horns
Keyboards – Howard Benson, Johnny Litten, Lenny Skolnik
Tenor saxophone – Neal Sugarman
Trumpet – Dave Guy

Production

A&R – Monica Benson, John Ehmann, Marta Navas, Katherine Neil, Marisa Torbet, Jeanne Venton
Digital editing – Paul DeCarlie
Drum technician – Jon Nicholson
Engineer – Wayne Gordon, Mike Plotnikoff
Assistant engineer – Sean Anders, Anthony Martinez, Muktar Muktar
Overdub engineer – Hatsukazu "Hatch" Inagaki 
Vocal engineer – Hatsukazu "Hatch" Inagaki 
Management – Ginger Ramsey, Brianne Widaman
Marketing – Jennifer Bowling
Mastering – Brian Gardner
Mixing – Chris Lord
Mixing assistant – Keith Armstrong, Ismael Barreto, Nik Karpen
Producer – Howard Benson, Les Scurry
Programming – Jonny Litten, Lenny Skolnik
Publicity – Meghan Prophet, Christine Wolff
String arrangement – Lenny Skolnik
Voices – Howard Benson

Release history

References

2014 debut albums
Albums produced by Howard Benson
Interscope Records albums
19 Recordings albums
Caleb Johnson (singer) albums